A Kind of Childhood is a 2002 Bangladeshi drama film directed by Tareque Masud and Catherine Masud. The film was awarded the Jury Prize at the International Video Festival of India in 2003.

Awards
Wins
 2003 Jury Prize — International Video Festival of India

References

External links
 A Kind of Childhood in libraries (WorldCat catalog)
 Tareque Masud's Filmography

2002 films
2002 drama films
Bengali-language Bangladeshi films
English-language Bangladeshi films
Bangladeshi drama films
2000s Bengali-language films
Short films directed by Tareque Masud
Films directed by Catherine Masud